Ross Roy is a heritage-listed former residence at 60 Harts Road, Indooroopilly, Brisbane, Queensland, Australia. It is within the grounds of St Peters Lutheran College and is currently used as school offices.

History
The house was built in 1897 for Daniel Collings, a tea merchant, and his family. The architect was Claude W. Chambers.

In 1910, the house was bought by William Ross Munro, a pastoralist, who named the property Ross Roy being a combination of his middle name Ross and name of his eldest son Roy.

References

External links

Indooroopilly, Queensland
Brisbane Local Heritage Register